The Reform Club is a private members' club on the south side of Pall Mall in central London, England. As with all of London's original gentlemen's clubs, it had an all-male membership for decades, but it was one of the first all-male clubs to change its rules to include the admission of women on equal terms in 1981. Since its foundation in 1836, the Reform Club has been the traditional home for those committed to progressive political ideas, with its membership initially consisting of Radicals and Whigs. However, it is no longer associated with any particular political party, and it now serves a purely social function.

The Reform Club currently enjoys extensive reciprocity with similar clubs around the world. It attracts a significant number of foreign members, such as diplomats accredited to the Court of St James's. Of the current membership of around 2,700, some 500 are "overseas members", and over 400 are women.

History

19th century
The club was founded by Edward Ellice, Member of Parliament (MP) for Coventry and Whig Whip, whose riches came from the Hudson's Bay Company but whose zeal was chiefly devoted to securing the passage of the Reform Act 1832; it held its first meeting at No. 104 Pall Mall on 5 May 1836.

This new club, for members of both Houses of Parliament, was intended to be a forum for the radical ideas which the First Reform Bill represented: its purpose was to promote "the social intercourse of the reformer of the United Kingdom.

The Reform Club's building was designed by renowned architect Sir Charles Barry and contracted to builders Grissell & Peto. The new club was built on palatial lines, the design being based on the Palazzo Farnese in Rome, and its Saloon in particular is regarded as the finest of all London's clubs. It was officially opened on 1 March 1841. Facilities provided included a library which, following extensive donations from members, grew to contain over 85,000 books.

20th century

After the Second World War and with the old Liberal Party's further decline, the club increasingly drew its membership from civil servants. The club continued to attract a comprehensive list of guest speakers including Government Ministers Nick Clegg and Theresa May (2011), Archbishop John Sentamu (2012), and Ambassador Liu Xiaoming (2013).

Literary associations
Besides having had many distinguished members from the literary world, including William Makepeace Thackeray and Arnold Bennett, the Reform played a role in some significant events, such as the feud between Oscar Wilde's friend and literary executor Robbie Ross and Wilde's ex-lover Lord Alfred Douglas. In 1913, after discovering that Lord Alfred had taken lodgings in the same house as himself with a view to stealing his papers, Ross sought refuge at the club, from where he wrote to Edmund Gosse, saying that he felt obliged to return to his rooms "with firearms".

Harold Owen, the brother of Wilfred Owen, called on Siegfried Sassoon at the Reform after Wilfred's death, and Sassoon himself wrote a poem entitled "Lines Written at the Reform Club", which was printed for members at Christmas 1920.

Appearances in popular culture and literature

Books
The Reform Club appears in Anthony Trollope's novel Phineas Finn (1867). This eponymous main character becomes a member of the club and there acquaints Liberal members of the House of Commons, who arrange to get him elected to an Irish parliamentary borough. The book is one of the political novels in the Palliser series, and the political events it describes are a fictionalized account of the build-up to the Second Reform Act (passed in 1867) which effectively extended the franchise to the working classes.

The club also appears in Jules Verne's Around the World in Eighty Days (published in 1872, as a novel in 1873); the protagonist, Phileas Fogg, is a member of the Reform Club who sets out to circumnavigate the world on a bet from his fellow members, beginning and ending at the club.

The Reform Club was used as a meeting place for MI6 operatives in Part 3, Chapter 1, p. 83ff of Graham Greene's spy novel The Human Factor (1978, Avon Books).

The Reform Club and its Victorian era celebrity chef Alexis Soyer play pivotal roles in MJ Carter's mystery novel The Devil's Feast (2016, Fig Tree).

Films and television
Michael Palin, following his fictional predecessor, also began and ended his televised 1989 journey around the world in 80 days at the Reform Club. Palin was not permitted to enter the building to complete his journey, as had been his intention, so his trip ended on the steps outside.

Victorian publisher Norman Warne is depicted visiting the Reform Club in the 2006 film Miss Potter. The club has been used as a location in a number of other films, including the fencing scene in the 2002 James Bond movie Die Another Day, The Quiller Memorandum (1966), The Man Who Haunted Himself (1970), Lindsay Anderson's O Lucky Man! (1973), The Avengers (1998), Nicholas Nickleby (2002), Quantum of Solace (2008), Sherlock Holmes (2009), Paddington (2014), and Christopher Nolan's Tenet (2020).

The club was also used in Chris Van Dusen's television series Bridgerton as a filming location.

Photoshoot
The Reform Club was the location of a photo shoot featuring Paula Yates for the 1979 summer issue of Penthouse.

Podcasts
In The Magnus Archives, the Reform Club was the possible location of Jurgen Leitner's library, and had secret underground tunnels.

Notable members

John Hamilton-Gordon, 1st Marquess of Aberdeen and Temair
Donald Adamson
H. H. Asquith
Sir David Attenborough
William Lygon, 7th Earl Beauchamp
Hilaire Belloc
Arnold Bennett
William Beveridge
Stewart Binns
Rt Hon Charles Booth
Dame Margaret Booth
Baroness Boothroyd
Mihir Bose
John Bright
Henry Brougham
Michael Brown, former Conservative MP
Guy Burgess
Donald Cameron of Lochiel
Sir Menzies Campbell
Sir Henry Campbell-Bannerman
Samuel Carter
Joseph Chamberlain
Andrew Carnegie
Henri Cartier-Bresson
Sir Winston Churchill, who resigned in 1913 in protest at the blackballing of a friend, Baron de Forest
Richard Cobden
Albert Cohen
Professor Martin Daunton
Sir Arthur Conan Doyle
Camilla, Duchess of Cornwall
Baroness Dean of Thornton-le-Fylde
Sir Charles Dilke
John Lambton, 1st Earl of Durham
Edward Ellice
Lord Falconer
Garret FitzGerald
Edward Morgan Forster
William Ewart Gladstone
Baroness Greengross
Sir William Harcourt
Lord Hattersley
Friedrich Hayek
Nick Hewer
Barbara Hosking
Sir Michael Howard
Sir Bernard Ingham
Sir Henry Irving
Henry James
Sir John Jardine
Lord Jenkins of Hillhead
William, Earl Jowitt
Ruth Lea
Roger Liddle
David Lloyd George, who resigned with Churchill over Baron de Forest's blackballing
Professor Sir Ravinder Maini
Dame Mary Marsh
Professor Javier_Martín-Torres
José Guilherme Merquior
James Moir
James Montgomrey, a founding member
Lord Morgan
Sir Derek Morris
Baroness Nicholson
Lord Noel-Buxton
Daniel O'Connell
Barry Edward O'Meara
David Omand
Viscount Palmerston
Dame Stella Rimington
Frederick Robinson, 2nd Marquess of Ripon
Bertram Fletcher Robinson
Curtis Roosevelt
Brian Roper
Archibald Primrose, 5th Earl of Rosebery
Viscount Runciman
Lord John Russell
Paul Scofield
Viscount Simon
George Smith
Sir Martin Sorrell
Very Rev Victor Stock
Sir Edward Sullivan
Prince Augustus Frederick, Duke of Sussex
Professor Alan M. Taylor
Dame Kiri Te Kanawa
William Makepeace Thackeray
Caroline Thomson
William Thomson, 1st Baron Kelvin
Jeremy Thorpe
Sir David Walker
Chaim Weizmann
H. G. Wells
Richard Grosvenor, 2nd Marquess of Westminster
Dame Jo Williams
Tony Wright, former Labour MP

See also
List of London's gentlemen's clubs

References

Further reading

Van Leeuwen, Thomas A P (2020) [2017]. The Magic Stove: Barry, Soyer and The Reform Club or How a Great Chef Helped to Create a Great Building. Amsterdam/Paris: Les Editions du Malentendu/ Jap Sam Books. .

External links

Reform Club website
Survey of London's entry on the Club
"The Reform Club: Architecture and the Birth of Popular Government", lecture by Peter Marsh and Paul Vonberg at Gresham College, 25 September 2007 (available for MP3 and MP4 download)
Reform Club library pamphlets
Mary Evans Picture Library – The Club's collection of caricatures
CBC.CA  Paul Kennedy's audio tour of the Club, broadcast in February 2011

Gentlemen's clubs in London
Grade I listed buildings in the City of Westminster
1836 establishments in the United Kingdom
Grade I listed clubhouses
Jules Verne
Organisations based in London with royal patronage
Charles Barry buildings